Simeon Stuart (15 May 1864 – 25 November 1939) was a British film actor of the silent era.

Selected filmography
 Snow in the Desert (1919)
 The Lady Clare (1919)
 The Face at the Window (1920)
 Inheritance (1920)
 The Auction Mart (1920)
 The Headmaster (1921)
 The Imperfect Lover (1921)
 A Gipsy Cavalier (1922)
 Love's Influence (1922)
 The Scourge (1922)
 Creation (1922)
 Afterglow (1923)
 Rob Roy (1922)
 Paddy the Next Best Thing (1923)
 The Temptation of Carlton Earle (1923)
 Réveille (1924)
 The Great Well (1924)
 Women and Diamonds (1924)
 Livingstone (1925)
 One of the Best (1927)
 The Vortex (1928)
 A Reckless Gamble (1928)

References

External links

1864 births
1939 deaths
British male silent film actors
20th-century British male actors